Tambaram Sanatorium railway station is one of the railway stations of the Chennai Beach–Chengelpet section of the Chennai Suburban Railway Network. It serves the neighbourhood of Tambaram Sanatorium and surrounding areas.

History
Tambaram Sanatorium railway station lies on the Madras Beach—Tambaram suburban section of the Chennai Suburban Railway, which was opened to traffic on 11 May 1931. The tracks were electrified on 15 November 1931. The section was converted to 25 kV AC traction on 15 January 1967. However, the station was built much later. When the Government Hospital of Thoracic Medicine expanded in the 1970s and gained importance, the railway station was built to serve the locality.

Safety
The stretch along the station is considered one of the deadliest accident zones in the Guindy–Chengalpet stretch of the suburban section, with about 15 accidents occurring every month as of 2011 in the Chromepet–Tambaram stretch.

See also

 Chennai Suburban Railway
 Railway stations in Chennai

References

External links
Tambaram Sanatorium railway station at Indiarailinfo.org

Stations of Chennai Suburban Railway
Railway stations in Chennai
Railway stations in Kanchipuram district